Rani Mukerji (pronounced ; born 21 March 1978) is an Indian actress who works in Hindi films. Noted for her versatility, she is the recipient of multiple accolades, including seven Filmfare Awards. Mukerji has featured in listings of the highest-paid actresses of the 2000s.

Although Mukerji was born into the Mukherjee-Samarth family, in which her parents and relatives were members of the Indian film industry, she did not aspire to pursue a career in film. As a teenager she dabbled with acting by starring in her father Ram Mukherjee's Bengali-language film Biyer Phool and in the social drama Raja Ki Aayegi Baraat (both 1996). Mukerji had her first commercial success with the action film Ghulam (1998) and breakthrough with the romance Kuch Kuch Hota Hai (1998). Following a brief setback, the year 2002 marked a turning point for her when she was cast by Yash Raj Films as the star of the drama Saathiya.

Mukerji established herself by starring in several commercially successful romantic films, including Chalte Chalte (2003), Hum Tum (2004), Veer-Zaara (2004), and Kabhi Alvida Naa Kehna (2006), and the crime comedy Bunty Aur Babli (2005). She also gained praise for playing an abused wife in the political thriller Yuva (2004) and a deaf and blind woman in the drama Black (2005). Mukerji's collaborations with Yash Raj Films from 2007 and 2010 produced several unsuccessful films and led critics to bemoan her choice of roles. This changed when she played a headstrong journalist in the thriller No One Killed Jessica (2011), and further success came for her starring roles in the thrillers Talaash (2012), Mardaani (2014) and its sequel Mardaani 2 (2019), and the comedy-drama Hichki (2018). The lattermost emerged as her highest-grossing release.

Mukerji is involved with humanitarian causes and is vocal about issues faced by women and children. She has participated in concert tours and stage shows, and featured as a talent judge for the 2009 reality show Dance Premier League. Mukerji is married to filmmaker Aditya Chopra, with whom she has a daughter.

Early life and work 

Mukerji was born in Mumbai (present-day Mumbai) on 21 March 1978. Her father, Ram Mukherjee (born to the Mukherjee-Samarth family), was a former film director and one of the founders of Filmalaya Studios. Her mother, Krishna Mukherjee, is a former playback singer. Her elder brother, Raja Mukherjee, is a film producer and director. Her maternal aunt, Debashree Roy, is a Bengali film actress and her paternal cousin, Kajol, is a Hindi film actress and her contemporary. Another paternal cousin, Ayan Mukerji, is a scriptwriter and film director. Despite her parents and most of her relatives being members of the Indian film industry, Mukerji was uninterested in pursuing a career in film. She said, "There were already too many actresses at home and I wanted to be someone different".

Mukerji received her education at Maneckji Cooper High School in Juhu and graduated with a degree in Home Science from SNDT Women's University. She is a trained Odissi dancer and began learning the dance form while in the tenth grade. As part of an annual tradition, the Mukherjee family celebrates the festival of Durga Puja in the suburban neighbourhood of Santacruz every year. Mukerji, a practising Hindu, takes part in the festivities with her entire family.

In 1994, director Salim Khan approached Mukerji to play the lead female role in his directorial, Aa Gale Lag Jaa. Her father disapproved of a full-time career in film at such a young age, so she rejected the offer. At age 18, following her mother's suggestion that she pursue acting on an experimental basis, Mukerji accepted leading roles in the social drama Raja Ki Aayegi Baraat, Khan's second offer to her, and her father's Bengali film Biyer Phool, both of which were released on the same day in October 1996. Before she began work on Raja Ki Aayegi Baraat, Mukerji trained at Roshan Taneja's acting institute. She portrayed a rape victim who is forced to marry her rapist in the film. Although the film was a commercial failure, Mukerji's performance earned her a special recognition trophy at the annual Screen Awards ceremony. Following the film's poor showing at the box office, Mukerji returned to college to complete her education. However, inspired by her cousin Kajol's success in Hindi films, she decided to pursue a full-time career in films.

Career

Breakthrough and initial struggle (1998–2001) 
In 1998, Mukerji starred opposite Aamir Khan in Vikram Bhatt's action film Ghulam, her first commercial success. Though her role in the film was small, the song "Aati Kya Khandala" earned her public recognition. Due to Mukerji's husky voice, Bhatt had someone with a higher pitched voice dub her lines; Mukerji stated that it was done as her voice "did not suit the character". In the same year, Karan Johar cast her opposite Shah Rukh Khan and Kajol in his directorial debut Kuch Kuch Hota Hai. The role was originally written for Twinkle Khanna, but when she and several other leading ladies rejected it, Johar signed Mukerji on the insistence of Khan and the filmmaker Aditya Chopra. She played Khan's character's love interest and later wife, Tina who dies after giving birth to their daughter. Johar had originally intended to dub Mukerji's voice, but she improved her diction and eventually provided her own voice. Reviewing the film for India Today, Nandita Chowdhury wrote that it was "the gorgeous Rani who steals the show. Oozing oomph from every pore, she also proves herself an actress whose time has come". Following this, she had starring roles in Mehndi (1998) and Hello Brother (1999), critical and commercial disappointments that failed to propel her career forward.

By 2000, Mukerji wanted to avoid typecasting as a "standard Hindi film heroine" and thus decided to portray more challenging roles in addition to the archetypical glamorous lead. In Badal and Bichhoo, two male-centric action dramas (both starring Bobby Deol), she played roles that were met with little acclaim from critics. A supporting role in Kamal Haasan's bilingual film Hey Ram proved more rewarding. The film was a partly fictionalised account of Mahatma Gandhi's assassination and Mukerji played a Bengali school teacher who is raped and murdered during communal riots in Calcutta. Having only portrayed glamorous roles thus far, she was challenged by Haasan's insistence on realism and to appear on screen without wearing make-up; she believed that the experience changed her approach to acting. The controversial subject matter of Hey Ram led to poor box office earnings, but the film was critically acclaimed and selected as India's official entry to the Oscars. After starring in the romantic comedies Hadh Kar Di Aapne and Kahin Pyaar Na Ho Jaaye, Mukerji starred alongside Salman Khan and Preity Zinta in the romantic comedy Har Dil Jo Pyar Karega, which earned her a Best Supporting Actress nomination at Filmfare. Padmaraj Nair of Screen found her role to be "too meagre for her to prove herself" but added that "she is quite adequate in whatever scenes she has been given".

Mukerji's first film of 2001, Chori Chori Chupke Chupke, was released after controversy over the film's funding by the Mumbai underworld delayed it by a few months. The film, based on surrogacy, marked her second collaboration with Salman Khan and Zinta. Film critic Sukanya Verma found Mukerji to be "handicapped with a role that doesn't give her much scope" and preferred the "meatier" role of Zinta. In Bas Itna Sa Khwaab Hai and Nayak: The Real Hero, films that failed to gain a wide audience theatrically, Mukerji played the love interests of Abhishek Bachchan and Anil Kapoor respectively. In a review for the latter film, Sarita Tanwar of Rediff.com bemoaned that she had "very little to do except being part of some magnificently picturised songs". An article in Mint summarised that a majority of her roles post Kuch Kuch Hota Hai were "inconsequential".

Established actress (2002–2006) 
Mukerji began collaborating with Yash Raj Films in 2002, when the company cast her in two  productions: Mujhse Dosti Karoge!, a romantic comedy co-starring Hrithik Roshan and Kareena Kapoor, and Saathiya, a remake of the Tamil romance Alaipayuthey. The former performed poorly at the box office, as did her two collaborations with Govinda that yearPyaar Diwana Hota Hai and Chalo Ishq Ladaaye. The romantic drama Saathiya, however, proved a turning point in her career. At the 48th Filmfare Awards, she received her first Best Actress nomination and was awarded the Critics Award for Best Actress. Shaad Ali cast her in the role of Suhani Sharma, a medical student who deals with the troubles of being married at a young age, for the vulnerability that he found in her. She refused the offer at first as she disliked the idea of remaking an accomplished film but was convinced to accept the part by the film's producer Aditya Chopra. In it, she played opposite Vivek Oberoi, with whom she did not enjoy working, saying that his "attitude was bothersome". Saathiya emerged as a commercial success. The BBC wrote that "Mukerji plays the character of a middle class girl with great conviction", and Udita Jhunjhunwala of Mid-Day added that "her expressions and acting are understated in a role that fits her like a glove".

The year 2003 marked the beginning of the most successful period in Mukerji's career. She replaced Aishwarya Rai to play the lead opposite Shah Rukh Khan in Aziz Mirza's romance Chalte Chalte. Media reports suggested that Rai was replaced after feuding with her then boyfriend Salman Khan on the film's sets, but Shah Rukh Khan insisted that Mukerji had been the original choice for the role. Mukerji believed that the theme of Chalte Chalte, which dealt with misunderstandings between a married couple, was similar to that of Saathiya, and she tried to lend variety to the role by putting "them against a different background". She has said that working with Shah Rukh Khan was a learning experience for her, and he would often scold her if she performed inadequately. A commercial success, Box Office India credited it as a career comeback for Mukerji, and she was rewarded with a second Best Actress nomination at Filmfare. None of her other releases of the year—Chori Chori, Calcutta Mail, and LOC Kargil—made a mark.

At the 50th Filmfare Awards, Mukerji won both the Best Actress and Best Supporting Actress awards, becoming the only actress to win both awards in the same year. The Best Supporting Actress win was for Mani Ratnam's Yuva (2004), a composite film with an ensemble cast, about three youngsters from different strata of society whose lives intersect by a car accident; Mukerji was cast as a poor Bengali housewife who is abused by her husband, a local goon (Abhishek Bachchan). She based her role on her house helps who were abused by their husbands, and observed their body language and speaking style. Taran Adarsh wrote, "Amongst the leading ladies, it is Rani Mukerji who is the best of the lot. The role demanded an actress of substance and Rani more than lives up to the expectations." She won the Best Actress award for her starring role in Kunal Kohli's Hum Tum (2004), a romantic comedy about two headstrong individuals who meet at different stages of their lives. The film pitted her opposite Saif Ali Khan and proved one of the biggest commercial successes of the year. The Hindu found Mukerji's portrayal of Rhea Prakash to be "self assuredly competent" and Tanmaya Kumar Nanda of Rediff.com wrote, "Rani is her usual collected self, changing into the many hues of her character with the ease of a chameleon".

This success continued when Yash Chopra cast her in his period romantic drama Veer-Zaara (2004). Set against the background of India–Pakistan relations, it is about the titular star-crossed lovers (Shah Rukh Khan and Preity Zinta). In a part originally written for a man, Mukerji played a Pakistani lawyer who tries to help the couple. Derek Elley of Variety took note of the "quietly dignified perf from Mukerji", and the BBC opined that she "deserves praise for her acting. To act through your eyes and not using dialogue is an art. Rani for one, has perfected this." She won the IIFA Award for Best Supporting Actress, and received a nomination in the same category at Filmfare.

In 2005, Outlook magazine published that Mukerji had established herself as the most successful actress of contemporary Hindi cinema. Her first film role that year was opposite Amitabh Bachchan in Sanjay Leela Bhansali's Black, a drama about an alcoholic man who dedicates his life to teach a blind and deaf girl how to communicate. Bhansali wrote the part of the blind-deaf girl specifically for Mukerji, who was initially hesitant to take on the role due to its "challenging" subject matter. Once Bhansali enforced his faith in her, she agreed and began studying sign language with professionals at the Helen Keller Institute in Mumbai. Black won several awards including two National Film Awards and 11 Filmfare Awards, and Richard Corliss of Time featured it as the fifth best film of the year. Empire magazine called Mukerji's performance "astonishing", and Filmfare included her work in their listing of Indian cinema's "80 Most Iconic performances" and wrote, "Rani has left an indelible mark with this role that usually comes once in a lifetime for most". She became the only actress to win both the Best Actress and Best Actress – Critics trophies at the Filmfare Awards ceremony.

Mukerji received another Best Actress nomination that year at Filmfare for her work opposite Abhishek Bachchan in Bunty Aur Babli, which marked her fifth collaboration with Yash Raj Films. She played the title character of Babli, a con woman. The film was the second highest-grossing Hindi film of 2005. Namrata Joshi of Outlook wrote that she "plays to the gallery with ease". Mukerji followed it with Amol Palekar's fantasy film Paheli, reuniting her with Shah Rukh Khan. The film was a box office flop in India but was given a strong international release; it was screened at the Sundance Film Festival and was India's submission for the Best Foreign Language Film at the 79th Academy Awards. Raja Sen of Rediff.com was impressed by the film as well as Mukerji's performance which he called "another perfectly played part". Mukerji's final release of the year was the period film Mangal Pandey: The Rising, about the titular soldier. Director Ketan Mehta initially approached her for a cameo appearance, which was developed into a larger part during filming. Her role was that of Heera, a prostitute who becomes the love interest of Pandey (Aamir Khan). Derek Elley mentioned that despite a small role, Mukerji made "the most of her feisty nautch-girl".

Mukerji turned down an offer from Mira Nair to star in the English film The Namesake, choosing instead to reteam with Karan Johar in Kabhi Alvida Naa Kehna (2006), a drama about infidelity. Collaborating once again with Shah Rukh Khan, Abhishek Bachchan and Zinta, she played an unhappily married woman who has an affair with a married man. Commenting on the divisive nature of her role, Mukerji said that it changed her own perception of love and marriage. Rajeev Masand wrote that the "consistently competent Rani Mukherjee takes on the film's toughest role  a part that may be hard to sympathise with  but she injects it with tenderness and believability", but Kaveree Bamzai of India Today dismissed it as another one of her roles requiring the "art of weeping copiously and smiling valiantly". It won Mukerji a third consecutive IIFA Award for Best Actress and a sixth Best Actress nomination at Filmfare. The poorly received melodrama Baabul was her final film appearance of that year.

Professional setback (2007–2010) 
Following the failure of Baabul, Yash Raj Films cast Mukerji in Siddharth Anand's family drama Ta Ra Rum Pum in the role of a racing driver's (Saif Ali Khan) wife and the mother of two. She was excited to play the part of a mother for the first time, and modelled her character after her own mother. Released in 2007, the film was a financial success, but received mixed reactions from critics. Khalid Mohamed hailed Mukerji's performance as "near flawless" but Rajeev Masand thought that neither she nor Khan "are able to make much of an impression because their characters are so unidimensional and boring." The drama Laaga Chunari Mein Daag from director Pradeep Sarkar starred Mukerji as a young woman who is forced to moonlight as a prostitute to fend for her family. Her portrayal earned her a seventh Best Actress nomination at Filmfare, but the film had poor critical and financial returns. Shubhra Gupta of The Indian Express noted that Mukerji was responsible for "hold[ing] the film together, even if her part, both as the ingénue and the hooker, doesn't have freshness".

Mukerji once again played a prostitute in Bhansali's Saawariya, an adaptation of Fyodor Dostoevsky's White Nights, co-starring Ranbir Kapoor and Sonam Kapoor. She insisted that the consecutive prostitutes she played were different from each other, with the one in Saawariya having "no problem with her profession". Her only release in three years not produced by Yash Raj Films, it was the first Indian film produced by a Hollywood studio, Sony Pictures. The film was a box office flop and met with poor reactions from critics. Mukerji's performance, which was described by A. O. Scott of The New York Times as "divine", earned her a second Filmfare nomination that year, this time for Best Supporting Actress. By the end of 2007, Mukerji's popularity had begun to wane. Rediff.com attributed this to her "monotonous pairing" with the same set of actors; Hindustan Times published that she had become an "exclusive Yash Raj heroine" which hindered other filmmakers from approaching her.

After a series of dramatic parts, Mukerji sought to play a light-hearted part, which she found in Kunal Kohli's Thoda Pyaar Thoda Magic (2008), a children's film about an angel who comes to Earth to help four troubled kids. In a scathing review, Khalid Mohamed criticised Mukerji's choice of roles and wrote that "she's one-dimensional, either darting full blast smiles or tetchy scowls. Her costumes, too, are uneasy-on-the-eyes". The film had low box office returns and further contributed to a decline in Mukerji's career prospects. An India Today article spoke of her "running out of luck at the box office" and mentioned her decline in endorsements.

In an attempt to overcome this decline, Mukerji lost weight and underwent a makeover. She continued to collaborate with Yash Raj Films, taking on a starring role opposite Shahid Kapoor in the romantic comedy Dil Bole Hadippa! (2009). Mukerji had high expectations from the film in which she played a cricket-obsessed Punjabi village girl masquerading as a man, and it had its world premiere at the Toronto International Film Festival. The Economic Times critic Gaurav Malani was disappointed with the picture and wrote that Mukerji "comes up with a spirited performance but her mock sob-whine-whimper do not amuse anymore. Also after a point you dislike visualizing the charming actress as the moustached male player". The film was Mukerji's fourth financial failure in a row. When questioned about her recent spate of flops with the Yash Raj Films banner, she defended the collaborations, saying that "I stand by those films regardless of their fate". Later that year, she featured as a talent judge for the Sony Entertainment Television reality show Dance Premier League. She agreed to appear on television to gain visibility during a low phase in her film career.

Success in thrillers and Hichki (2011–2020) 

Aniruddha Guha of Daily News and Analysis described Mukerji's performance in the 2011 film No One Killed Jessica as "one of her best performances till date". Co-starring Vidya Balan, the film was Mukerji's first commercial success since Ta Ra Rum Pum, and was especially noted for being so in the absence of a male star. Based on the Jessica Lal murder case, it featured Mukerji as a fictionalised foul-mouthed journalist who is deeply involved with the case. She has described how different the role was from the ones she had previously played, saying, "I actually had to play a man!" Certain critics, however, were critical of her performance, including Anupama Chopra, who called her role "the fatal, false note", arguing that "the character is written superficially and Rani's portrayal of her is equally banal. It's all about externals. She argues a lot and proudly labels herself a bitch but her hair stays perfectly in place and in the end, she even gets to do a super-hero-like slow motion walk." Even so, the role earned her a third Best Supporting Actress trophy at Filmfare.

Mukerji next accepted a leading role in the comedy of manners Aiyyaa (2012). Under the direction of Sachin Kundalkar, she played a woman with a heightened sense of smell who develops a one-sided attraction towards Prithviraj Sukumaran's character. Critically and commercially unsuccessful, Rediff.com criticised her decision to star in the film, writing that she "gets no support from the way her character is written". Greater success came for her portrayal of Roshni Shekhawat, a mother grieving the death of her child, in Reema Kagti's psychological thriller Talaash: The Answer Lies Within. Ronnie Schieb of Variety described Mukerji as "vivid in a quietly sympathetic role", and she received a Best Supporting Actress nomination at Filmfare.

In 2013, Mukerji starred in the anthology film Bombay Talkies consisting of four short films. She was part of the segment helmed by Johar, in which she played a journalist who discovers that her husband (Randeep Hooda) is gay. The film was screened at the 2013 Cannes Film Festival. Despite poor box office returns, Bombay Talkies met with critical acclaim, particularly for Johar's segment; Tushar Joshi of Daily News and Analysis praised the subtlety in Mukerji's performance. The following year, Mukerji starred in Pradeep Sarkar's crime thriller Mardaani, in which she played the lead role of Shivani Shivaji Roy, a Marathi policewoman involved in a kidnapping case that leads her to uncover secrets of human trafficking. She took on the role to show girls "how they need to protect themselves". In preparation, she interacted with senior officials of Mumbai Police, and learned the Israeli self-defence technique of Krav Maga. Rajeev Masand credited Mukerji for "investing Shivani with both physical strength and emotional courage, she gives us a hero that's hard not to root for", and Anupama Chopra commended her for providing her character with both "steely resolve" and "emotional depth". The film was a commercial success and garnered Mukerji another Best Actress nomination at Filmfare.

Following the birth of her child, Mukerji took a four-year hiatus to focus on her daughter and was persuaded by her husband, Aditya Chopra, to return to acting. She was keen to work on a project that would accommodate her parental commitments and found it in the comedy-drama Hichki (2018). Inspired by Brad Cohen's autobiography Front of the Class, the film tells the story of Naina Mathur, an aspiring teacher suffering from Tourette syndrome who must prove herself by educating underprivileged children. Mukerji interacted with Cohen and she trained to make her character's motor and vocal tics appear spontaneous and not rehearsed. In a mixed review, Anna M. M. Vetticad of Firstpost wrote that she "lifts Hichki every time she is on the scene, bringing empathy and charm to Naina's character without at any moment soliciting the audience's pity." It earned  worldwide, a majority of which came from the Chinese box office, and its success led Mukerji to express an interest in working more frequently in the future. She gained another Best Actress nomination at Filmfare.

Mukerji reprised her role as Shivani Shivaji Roy in Mardaani 2 (2019), directed by Gopi Puthran, who wrote the first film. In it, Roy faces off against a young rapist (Vishal Jethwa). The Indian Express wrote that Mukerji is "in command right through as she works to a script which pushes her to the fore at every given chance", but Rahul Desai of Film Companion criticised her for overplaying Roy "as more of a Dhoom franchise character" than a cop. Mardaani 2 performed well at the box office and gained her another nomination for the Filmfare Award for Best Actress. The commercial success of three consecutive films led Filmfare to credit Mukerji for breaking "the stereotype that actresses have battled for generations that post marriage and kids, an actress' career gets over in Bollywood".

Intermittent work (2021–present) 
In 2021, Mukerji reprised her part as Babli from Bunty Aur Babli in the successor Bunty Aur Babli 2. A commercial and critical failure, the film was panned for its technical aspects but Mukerji's performance and comic timing were better received by reviewers for Hindustan Times and The Times of India.  Mukerji next starred in Mrs Chatterjee Vs Norway (2023), a drama about a real-life Bengali woman whose children were taken away by the Norwegian Child Welfare Services. Reviewing the film for Screen Daily, Namrata Joshi dismissed the film's melodramatic tone, adding that "most disappointing is an otherwise reliable Mukherji being far from effective in her shrill and showy turn".

Personal life  

Mukerji prefers not to publicise her personal life. She limits her interactions with the media and is sometimes labelled a recluse; she said in a 2011 interview, "Today actors have become more open with the media. But this has posed a problem for actors like me because if I don't do that, then I end up being called reclusive. So now I have changed myself and am easily approachable." Mukerji has collaborated frequently and maintained a close friendship with actors Shah Rukh Khan and Aamir Khan, and filmmaker Karan Johar. 

The nature of Mukerji's relationship with filmmaker Aditya Chopra was the topic of fervent tabloid reporting in India, though she refused to publicly talk about it. According to media reports, she and Chopra started dating soon after his divorce. “He was just out of his divorce and I think he was in no mind to see someone,” Rani had told in an interview. On 21 April 2014, she married Chopra at a private Bengali ceremony in Italy. The following year, she gave birth to their daughter Adira. She has said that "the time spent being a mother is the happiest period of my life". Mukerji has said that she believes in maintaining a work-life balance after motherhood, adding that "it is extremely important for [a mother] to have a career and use her time constructively". She does not have any social media account as she prefers to keep a low profile.

Off-screen work

Stage shows and other appearances 
Mukerji has participated in several concert tours and televised award ceremonies. Her first concert tour, "Magnificent Five", was in 1999 in which she performed with actors Aamir Khan, Aishwarya Rai, Akshaye Khanna and Twinkle Khanna. The "Temptations 2004" concert had Mukerji perform alongside Shah Rukh Khan, Saif Ali Khan, Preity Zinta, Arjun Rampal and Priyanka Chopra in 19 stage shows worldwide. The following year, she participated in the "Temptations 2005" concert in New Delhi with Shah Rukh Khan, Fardeen Khan, Ameesha Patel and Malaika Arora Khan; the show was organised to help raise funds for the National Centre For Promotion of Employment for Disabled People (NCPEDP). 

In 2010, Mukerji performed at a concert in the Army Stadium of Dhaka, Bangladesh with several Bollywood actors including Shah Rukh Khan, Rampal and Ishaa Koppikar. For the "Temptations Reloaded" concert of 2012 in Jakarta, Mukerji performed alongside Shah Rukh Khan, Zinta and Bipasha Basu, for the 2013 concert of the same name in Auckland, she performed with Shah Rukh Khan, Madhuri Dixit and Jacqueline Fernandez, and in 2014 she performed in Malaysia with Shah Rukh Khan, Dixit, Yo Yo Honey Singh and Arijit Singh.

Mukerji was all set to make her appearance at Cannes Film Festival, 2011 with Sabyasachi Mukherjee and Karan Johar, but later opted out due to her father's ill health. She has also been part of documentaries including Bollywood im Alpenrausch, Gambling, Gods and LSD and The Outer World of Shah Rukh Khan. In addition, Mukerji has often turned muse for various designers including Sabyasachi at the Lakme Fashion Week. She walked ramp for Salman Khan's Being Humans fantastic 40s era fashion during "The Couture for a Cause - The Being Human Show" in 2010.

Humanitarian work 
Alongside her acting career, Mukerji is involved with humanitarian causes and is vocal about issues faced by women and children. Mukerji was appointed as an ambassador by Procter & Gamble and the NGO Child Rights and You for their joint venture, Shiksha, to endorse the cause of children's education. In 2011 she set up a Stroke Treatment Fund, in association with the Indian Stroke Association, to pay for the treatment of financially deprived stroke-affected patients. She has made public appearances to support other charities and causes. In March 2004, she visited the Indian army unit in Pokhran, Rajasthan to interact with the jawan troops, for the NDTV reality show Jai Jawan. A decade later, in August 2014, she visited the jawans again at Baramulla. In February 2005, Mukerji and several other Bollywood actors participated in the 2005 HELP! Telethon Concert to raise money for the victims of the 2004 Indian Ocean earthquake. 

In March 2006, Mukerji celebrated her birthday with the physically challenged children of the Helen Keller Institute; she had previously worked with them while preparing for her role in Black. In November 2010, she was part of a fund raising auction for the "Because I am a Girl" charity campaign. In 2014, Mukerji attended a charity dinner on child abuse in London, where she was felicitated by Prince Charles for raising awareness on the issue through her work in Mardaani.

Mukerji also attended "Junoon" charity cricket match, hosted by the Rotaract Club of HR College Mumbai in 2012. She appeared as celebrity guest on Kaun Banega Crorepatis Hindi and Bengali version, after which she donated the received prize money for social causes. She donated Hindi versions prize money to the Bandra Holy Family Hospital, for their NICU centre and donated Bengali versions money for other charity works.

Artistry and media image 
Mukerji is considered in the media as one of the most popular and accomplished actresses of Bollywood. As part of a career analysis, Sukanya Verma noted that after making an unconventional debut in films, Mukerji oscillated between success and failure for a few years before achieving "the status of a star, performer and showgirl". Indo-Asian News Service reported that during her initial years in the industry, Mukerji was written off as the successful Kajol's poor cousin for being "plump" and "short". Raja Sen opined that despite that, Mukerji "slogged her way with grit" to emerge a successful star.

Mukerji's directors Pradeep Sarkar and Reema Kagti have taken note of how much Mukerji prepares for her roles, with Kagti adding, "She gets obsessive about the role and wants to know everything about her character. What's her character's back-story, what is going on in her head at a specific point". Mukerji described her approach to acting in 2012:

A month before I start shooting, I sit with my director, try to understand how he has visualised the character on the screen and take notes. Then I start working on the most basic thing – the look. It's very important that the physical appearance of the character gets decided because if I look the character, it makes it all the more believable. Once that is achieved, I go into the finer nuances of what the girl is like, her background. And then from there [...] I have to get the accent right.  

Mukerji actively avoids typecasting, and has been credited in the media for her versatility. Hindustan Times has published that she balances between high-profile blockbusters and small-scale films. Namrata Joshi of Outlook adds that she is unafraid to take risks and portray roles that "none of her contemporaries have been able to do". Mukerji has played several roles that were considered to be a departure from traditional portrayals of women in mainstream Indian cinema at that time; in Hum Tum she played a widow who engages in pre-marital sex, in Kabhi Alvida Naa Kehna she is involved in an extra-marital affair with a married man, and in Bichhoo and No One Killed Jessica she smokes, drinks and mouths expletives. The media cites her as an "unconventional beauty" – her husky voice, eyes and smile being her distinctive features. Baradwaj Rangan believes that Mukerji's unusual "sandpaper-scratchy, I'm-recovering-from-a-bad-cold" voice sets her apart from her contemporaries.

At the peak of her career, Mukerji featured in listings of the most attractive Indian celebrities, was one of the highest-paid actresses in Bollywood, and the brand ambassador for a number of products. Filmfare featured her in their listing of the ten most powerful people in Bollywood for two consecutive years (2005–2006). Mukerji was ranked by the UK magazine Eastern Eye as "Asia's Sexiest Women" between 2006 and 2012. Mukerji featured in Box Office India's top actresses listing for six years and ranked first for two consecutive years (2005–2006). She featured in Rediff.com's annual listing of the best Bollywood actresses in 2002–2007, 2012, 2014 and 2018 and topped the list for three consecutive years (2004–2006). She was also featured by Rediff.com in their listing of Bollywood's best actresses of all time in 2007. Since 2007, Mukerji's popularity was on a decline and she lost out on her brand endorsements to a number of younger actresses. American hip hop  Blue Scholars, named a song after Mukerji in their 2011 album Cinemetropolis. In 2013, she featured among the greatest Bollywood stars in a UK poll celebrating 100 years of Indian cinema. That same year, the American Embassy in India honoured her with a special trophy for her contributions to Indian cinema. In 2015, the University of Mumbai felicitated her for her contribution to Bollywood, in 2017, she was honoured with the Outstanding Contribution to Cinema Award by the Government of Mauritius, and in 2018, was received an award for Excellence in Cinema at the Indian Film Festival of Melbourne. She was placed in Outlook Indias 75 Best Bollywood Actresses list.

Accolades 

For her roles in the films Kuch Kuch Hota Hai (1998), Yuva (2004) and No One Killed Jessica (2011), Mukerji won the Filmfare Award for Best Supporting Actress. She also won the Filmfare Critics Award for Best Actress for Saathiya (2002) and Black (2005), and the Filmfare Award for Best Actress for Hum Tum (2004) and Black (2005).

See also 

 List of Indian film actresses
 List of Bengali actresses
 List of Bollywood Clans: The Mukherjees

References

External links 
 
 

1978 births
Living people
20th-century Indian politicians
21st-century Indian politicians
Filmfare Awards winners
20th-century Indian women
20th-century Indian people
21st-century Indian actresses
Bengali people
Bengali Hindus
Indian film actresses
Indian voice actresses
Actresses in Bengali cinema
Actresses in Tamil cinema
Actresses from Kolkata
Indian Hindus
Actresses in Hindi cinema
SNDT Women's University alumni
Screen Awards winners
Zee Cine Awards winners
International Indian Film Academy Awards winners